Gyeongsang (Gyeongsang-do) was one of the eight provinces of Korea during the Joseon dynasty. Gyeongsang was located in the southeast of Korea.

The provincial capital was Daegu. The region was the birthplace of the Kingdom of Silla, which unified Korea in 668 CE. The region also has a significant role in modern Korean history, since seven previous South Korean presidents (Park Chung-hee, Roh Tae-woo, Chun Doo-hwan, Kim Young-sam, Roh Moo-hyun, Park Geun-hye, and Moon Jae-in) were born in the Gyeongsang region.

Today, the region is divided into 5 administrative divisions: the three independent cities of Busan, Daegu and Ulsan, and the two provinces of Gyeongsangbuk-do and Gyeongsangnam-do. The largest city in the region is Busan, followed by Daegu. Sub-regionally, the region is also divided into Gyeongbuk and Gyeongnam. Gyeongbuk consists of Daegu and Gyeongsangbuk-do, while Gyeongnam consists of Busan, Ulsan and Gyeongsangnam-do.

History
The predecessor to Gyeongsang Province was formed during the Goryeo Dynasty, replacing the former provinces of Yeongnam, Sannam and Yeongdong.

Gyeongsang acquired its current name in 1314.  The name derives from names of the principal cities of Gyeongju (경주; 慶州) and Sangju (상주; 尙州).

In 1895, Gyeongsang Province was replaced by the Districts of Andong (Andong-bu; 안동부; 安東府) in the north, Daegu (Daegu-bu; 대구부; 大邱) in the centre, Jinju (Jinju-bu; 진주부; 晉州府) in the southwest, and Dongnae (Dongnae-bu; 동래부; 東萊府; modern-day Busan) in the southeast.

In 1896, Andong, Daegu, and northern Dongnae Districts were merged to form North Gyeongsang Province, and Jinju and southern Dongnae Districts were merged to form South Gyeongsang Province.  North and South Gyeongsang are today part of South Korea.

Language
The language used in Gyeongsang province (south and north) is the Yeongnam dialect of Korean, also called the Gyeongsang dialect, and the intonation and vocabulary is different from the standard Seoul dialect (표준어, pyojuneo) in several ways. Yeongnam dialect itself is further subdivided into several dialects. For example, Busan dialect is slightly different from Andong dialect and Uljin dialect.

Geography
Gyeongsang Province was bounded on the west by Jeolla and Chungcheong Provinces, on the north by Gangwon Province, on the south by Korea Strait, and on the east by the Sea of Japan.  The region is ringed by the Taebaek and Sobaek Mountains and is drained by the Nakdong River.

The largest cities in the region are Busan, Daegu, and Ulsan.  Other cities of note are Gyeongju (the former capital of Silla), Andong, Yeongju, Sangju, Gimcheon, Miryang, Gimhae, Changwon (the capital of South Gyeongsang), Masan, and Jinju.

The Gyeongsang region as a whole is often referred to by the regional and former provincial name of "Yeongnam"  (The term "Yeongdong" is applied today to Gangwon Province).

External links
 Seoul City history article on Hanseong and 22 other late 19th-century districts (in Korean)

Provinces of Korea
Joseon dynasty